Slobodan Dubajić (born 19 February 1963) is a Serbian former footballer who played as a defender.

Club career
Dubajić played for his hometown club Proleter Zrenjanin between 1982 and 1991, making his Yugoslav First League debut in his last season. He subsequently moved abroad to Germany and joined VfB Stuttgart, helping them win the Bundesliga in his debut season. In total, Dubajić made 116 league appearances and scored seven goals over the course of his four years with the club. He also briefly played for Turkish side Zeytinburnuspor, before moving to Japan and spending four years at Vegalta Sendai.

International career
At international level, Dubajić was called up to Yugoslavia's UEFA Euro 1992 squad. However, the country received a ban just days before the tournament due to the Yugoslav Wars and the team returned home.

Later on, Dubajić was capped once for FR Yugoslavia, playing the first half of a 2–0 friendly loss to Brazil on 23 December 1994, in what was the country's inaugural match.

Career statistics

Club

International

References

Honours
VfB Stuttgart
 Bundesliga: 1991–92
 DFB-Supercup: 1992

External links
 
 
 
 
 
 

1963 births
Living people
Sportspeople from Zrenjanin
Yugoslav footballers
Serbia and Montenegro footballers
Serbian footballers
Association football defenders
Serbia and Montenegro international footballers
FK Proleter Zrenjanin players
VfB Stuttgart players
Zeytinburnuspor footballers
Vegalta Sendai players
Yugoslav Second League players
Yugoslav First League players
Bundesliga players
Süper Lig players
Japan Football League (1992–1998) players
J2 League players
Yugoslav expatriate footballers
Serbia and Montenegro expatriate footballers
Expatriate footballers in Germany
Expatriate footballers in Turkey
Expatriate footballers in Japan
Yugoslav expatriate sportspeople in Germany
Serbia and Montenegro expatriate sportspeople in Germany
Serbia and Montenegro expatriate sportspeople in Turkey
Serbia and Montenegro expatriate sportspeople in Japan